The United States Ambassador-at-Large for Arctic Affairs advances the Arctic policy of the United States, engages with counterparts in Arctic and non-Arctic nations as well as Indigenous groups, and works closely with domestic stakeholders, including state, local, and Tribal governments, businesses, academic institutions, non-profit organizations, other federal government agencies, and Congress. The United States cooperates the Arctic, foremost through the Arctic Council, and the Ambassador-at-Large works in close partnership with the U.S. Senior Arctic Official, the federal Arctic science community, and the Arctic Executive Steering Committee.

List of ambassadors

References 

United States Ambassadors-at-Large